is a series of video games created by Sega AM3 (Amusement Research and Development Department 3, later renamed Hitmaker). The series was created by Juro Watari. The original series was first published for arcades in January 1996. The game features fast, action-oriented gameplay requiring quick reflexes. It has seen five installments to date and has been ported to several video game consoles.

The mecha designs for all installments of the series were created by robot designer Hajime Katoki.

Related merchandise released for sale include plastic models, original soundtracks, trading figurines, light novels and audio drama CDs.

Games 
The games in the series are as follows.
Virtual On: Cyber Troopers (Virtual-On: Operation Moongate) 
Released between 1995 and 1996 for arcades, Sega Saturn, and PC. The Saturn version of the game is one of few games that supports the SEGA Net on the console. It also features the Sega Twin Stick Peripheral. The game features M.S.B.S. v3.3 (Arcade), v3.3s (Sega Saturn) and v.3.3w (Windows PC), among others.
Cyber Troopers Virtual-On Oratorio Tangram 
Released between 1998 and 2000 for arcades and Sega Dreamcast, with special peripheral device, the Twin Sticks, and in 2009 for Microsoft Xbox 360's Xbox Live Arcade service. Very few VOOT arcade units made it outside Japan. The US release of VOOT on Dreamcast had many features locked for unknown reasons, such as Cable Versus and Custom Virtuaroid, and the game was not released in Europe. Later versions for the arcade incorporated a VMU slot for imported colours created on the Japanese version of VOOT on Sega Dreamcast. The game features M.S.B.S. v5.2 (Early Arcade), v5.4 (Arcade), v.5.45 (Sega Dreamcast), v5.6 (Rare Bonus disc addon) and 5.66 (Late Arcade and Xbox 360 XBLA).
Cyber Troopers Virtual-On Force 
Released exclusively in Japanese arcades in 2001. It was the first game in the series to be released after AM3 was renamed to Hitmaker, and features a new system of gameplay where players are teamed up in pairs to oppose another pair, with a leader/subordinate ruleset. The machines use a card system found in other arcade machines to keep player data. The game features M.S.B.S. v7.5, v7.6 and v7.7. The game is later released on the Xbox 360 on December 22, 2010.
Cyber Troopers Virtual-On Marz 
First released in Japan and the United States in 2003 for the PlayStation 2, and was rereleased on PlayStation 3 in Japan in 2013. It uses the VO: Force rules for gameplay and graphics, and is the first Virtual On game to have a single player story mode, which follows on with the Virtual-On universe. As the PlayStation 2 has no official Twin Sticks, the game's controls rely on the DualShock controllers (this was corrected in PS3 rerelease with twin-stick peripheral configuration). As inclusion of story mode, this game is regarded more as an action-adventure game than simply an action game. The game features M.S.B.S. v8.5.
A Certain Magical Virtual-On
First released in Japan for the PlayStation 4 and PlayStation Vita in 2018. The game is a collaboration between Sega and Dengeki Bunko, featuring characters from Kazuma Kamachi's light novel series A Certain Magical Index. The game features M.S.B.S. v55.55. It was released on February 15, 2018.

Overview 
Virtual-On features mecha called Virtuaroids, or VRs, that are large robots the player controls in battles against enemy VRs, and its twin-stick control, in which two joysticks, complemented by an array of controls, are used by players. Additionally, in the plot of the first game, Virtual On: Cyber Troopers, the Virtual-On's arcade machine is actually a remote operation device sent from the future in search of "Virtual-On Positive" (VO+) pilots.

Plastic models 
The first plastic model series based on Virtuaroid was released shortly before Japanese release of Oratorio Tangram, and were made by Wave Corporation. These Virtuaroid models are borrowed from Operation Moongate as well as Oratorio Tangram, One Man Rescue and Fragmentary Passage. These models were also made by Kotobukiya, which is well known for making plastic models of Medabots anime and manga series.

Hasegawa Corporation also manufactures the plastic model kits of Virtuaroids from Cyber Troopers Virtual-On Force and Marz video games. Some Virtuaroids, which were originally available only in a few version, were expanded to including spinoffs, such as Virtuaroid Guarayakha with special equipment, and more alternate-colored versions of some Virtuaroids.

As of 2014, plastic models of Virtual On franchise are still in production.

Appearances in other media 
The Virtuaroids Temjin 747J, Ahparmd the HA-T and Fei-Yen the Knight from the Virtual-On series appeared in the Japanese, turn-based strategy game Super Robot Wars Alpha 3. This was the first occasion of characters from a video game series, owned neither by Banpresto nor their parent company Namco Bandai, appearing in a Super Robot Wars game. Of note about the game is that if the other pilots in the game remove their suits, approach the Virtuaroids and try to speak to their pilots, the Virtuaroids would say that they were being remote-piloted by pilots in another plane or dimension.

In the PSP rhythm-action game Hatsune Miku: Project DIVA Extend, the third game in the Project DIVA series, one of the available outfits for Miku to wear was based on Fei-Yen. The special outfit was later made into plastic model figure.

A reference to Virtual On can be found in 21st episode of Hyōka anime, where Hōtarō and Satoshi play the Operation Moongate with the Virtuaroids Raiden and Viper II respectively.

Temjin and Fei-Yen appeared in Senko No Ronde 2 as selectable characters via downloadable content.

An emulated version of the original Virtual On arcade game can be played at the in-game arcade in Yakuza Kiwami 2.

The visual novels Kimi ga Nozomu Eien and Muv-Luv features a nearly identical version instead called Cyber Legion Valgern On.

References

External links 
Official
  

General resources
 Virtual-Century A fan-created database of Virtuaroids and general storyline information, taken from Sega's official guidebooks. 

 
Video game franchises
Sega Games franchises
Video games about mecha
Fictional duos
Post-apocalyptic video games
Video games about robots
Science fantasy video games
Video games developed in Japan
Video game franchises introduced in 1995